Von Trapp children may refer to:

 the family in the musical The Sound of Music and the film based on it
 the musical group The von Trapps